Percy Andreae (October 31, 1858 – May 3, 1924) was an English-American brewer and influential anti-prohibitionist during the early part of the 20th century. After the anti-Saloon League made sweeping victories in the 1908 Ohio state elections, Andreae organized effective resistance to the temperance movement. He soon organized and became president of The National Association of Commerce and Labor to fight temperance organizations on the national level. It largely employed former state Senators and Representatives to further its work.

Andreae was born in Clapham, London to a German father, Carl Andreae of Frankfurt, and an English mother, Emilie Sillem. During the 1890s, Andreae wrote several works of fiction, many of which first appeared in The Windsor Magazine.

Andreae immigrated to the United States in 1896. He settled in Cincinnati before moving to Chicago, becoming a U.S. citizen in 1914. He died in Winnetka, Illinois, aged 65.

Writings

Fiction
Stanhope of Chester: A Mystery (London: Smith, Elder, 1894)
The Mask and the Man: A Novel (London: Smith, Elder, 1894)
The Signora: A Tale (London: Smith, Elder, 1895)
The Vanished Emperor (London: Ward, Lock, 1896)
A Life at Stake (London: Ward, Lock, 1902)

Non-fiction
 The Prohibition Movement (Chicago: Felix Mendelsohn, 1915)

References

1858 births
1924 deaths
American temperance activists
English emigrants to the United States
English people of German descent
American people of German descent
People from Clapham
American brewers
Writers from London